Dahner Felsenland is a Verbandsgemeinde ("collective municipality") in the Südwestpfalz district, in Rhineland-Palatinate, Germany. It is situated in the Palatinate forest, approx. 15 km southeast of Pirmasens, and 25 km west of Landau. Its seat of administration is in its central town, Dahn. The area is known for its red sandstone cliffs, many of them crowned with ruined castles.

The Verbandsgemeinde Dahner Felsenland consists of the following Ortsgemeinden ("local municipalities"):

Verbandsgemeinde in Rhineland-Palatinate
Palatinate Forest
South Palatinate